Ridleys Ferry, later Benton Mills, is a former settlement in Mariposa County, California.

It was located on the south bank of the Merced River, opposite the settlement of Bagby.

History
It was on the Rancho Las Mariposas, an 1844 Mexican land grant acquired in 1847 by John C. Frémont.  During the California Gold Rush Frémont built a stamp mill at Ridleys Ferry, and renamed it Benton Mills in honor of his father-in-law Senator Thomas Hart Benton.

Thomas E. Ridley operated a ferry across the Merced River at the site from 1850 to 1852.

The settlement endured during the 1850s and 1860s.

References

Former settlements in Mariposa County, California
Merced River
Mining communities of the California Gold Rush
1850 establishments in California
Former populated places in California